Nemzeti Dohánybolt (Hungarian for 'national tobacco store') is a state-owned store responsible for all legal sales of tobacco within Hungary. The company responsible for running the stores, Nemzeti Dohánykereskedelmi Nonprofit Zrt, was founded in 2011 after the Second Orbán Government passed laws intended to curb the sale of tobacco.

The shops must not have wares on display to those outside, similar to the rules for betting shops in the United Kingdom. Depending on the size of the shop, they also may often serve coffee and soft drinks, but it is illegal to smoke in a dohánybolt. Some of the larger have tables outside and essentially become a café.

The government allowed the opening of one store for every 2000 residents in each city. Later on, the limit was raised to 3000 people per store.

General rules 
To open a tobacco store a license must be obtained from the Nemzeti Dohánykereskedelmi Nonprofit Zrt. (NDN Zrt.) using the public tender system. If the agency approves the petition, a contract must be signed which permits the license holder to operate the store for 20 years.

References

Drugs in Hungary
Government-owned companies of Hungary
Retail companies of Hungary
Hungarian brands
Tobacco companies of Hungary